Kardegar Mahalleh or Kardgar Mahalleh or Kard Gar Mahalleh may refer to:
 Kardegar Mahalleh, Fereydunkenar
 Kardegar Mahalleh, Tonekabon